The General Council of the International Workingmen's Association was formed on October 5 1864 following the St. Martin's Hall Meeting held the previous week. The Universal League for the Material Elevation of the Industrious Classes provided a base for them to operate from at 18 Greek Street.

References

International Workingmen's Association